Mariestads BK is a Swedish football club located in Mariestad, currently playing in Division 5 Västergötland Norra.

Background
Mariestads Bollklubb was formed in July 1929 by Alla Lindqvist. The club name is often abbreviated as MBK or nicknamed "Bollis". The club has a loyal fan base, with the most famous grouping being known as Bollis Trogna (BT) – which translates as "Loyal Bollis".

Since their foundation Mariestads BK has participated mainly in the middle and lower divisions of the Swedish football league system.  The club currently plays in Division 5 Västergötland Norra which is the seventh tier of Swedish football. They play their home matches at the Vänershofs IP in Mariestad.

Mariestads BK are affiliated to Västergötlands Fotbollförbund. The other main club in the town is IFK Mariestad and the rivalry is enormous. The activity and support in the Mariestads BK fan base has later diminished due to an increased number of police arrests and charges.

Recent history
In recent seasons Mariestads BK have competed in the following divisions:

2011 – Division V, Västergötland Norra
2010 – Division V, Västergötland Norra
2009 – Division V, Västergötland Norra
2008 – Division V, Västergötland Norra
2007 – Division IV, Västergötland Norra
2006 – Division V, Västergötland Norra
2005 – Division IV, Västergötland Norra
2004 – Division IV, Västergötland Norra
2003 – Division IV, Västergötland Norra
2002 – Division IV, Västergötland Norra
2001 – Division IV, Västergötland Norra
2000 – Division IV, Västergötland Norra
1999 – Division IV, Västergötland Norra

Attendances

In recent seasons Mariestads BK have had the following average attendances:

Footnotes

External links
 Mariestads BK – Official website

Association football clubs established in 1929
Football clubs in Västra Götaland County
1929 establishments in Sweden